Lausitzer Rundschau is a daily regional newspaper published in Cottbus, Brandenburg, Germany. It has been in circulation since 1946.

History and profile

Lausitzer Rundschau was founded in Bautzen and first published with a cover price of 15 pfennigs, on 20 May 1946. It was a regional media outlet of the East German ruling party, Socialist Unity Party, and the editor-in-chief was Paula Acker. In 1952 the offices of the paper moved to Görlitz, the largest town in the Upper Lusatia region. The paper consisted of eight pages. On 5 August 1952 the paper moved to its current headquarters in Cottbus.

The paper was owned by the Socialist Unity Party before German reunification. Following the unification the daily became part of the Georg von Holtzbrinck Publishing Group. The company also owned other newspapers, including Saarbrücker Zeitung. 

Lausitzer Rundschau is published in tabloid format by a subsidiary of the Saarbrücker Zeitung Group, LR Medienverlag und Druckerei GmbH. In September 2012 the majority share of Saarbrücker Zeitung Group was acquired by Rheinische Post Mediengruppe.

The paper serves the states of Brandenburg and Saxony and has 13 editions. Since 2 March 2006 LR-Woche, a free weekly tabloid, has been delivered with the paper.

Lausitzer Rundschau was called Lügenrudi (German: Liar Tom) when it was published in East Germany. The daily publishes extensive reports on neo-nazi activity in the region. The offices of Lausitzer Rundschau has been target for the attacks by right-wing extremists in Lübbenau and Spremberg.

In 2000 Simone Wendler became chief reporter who was awarded for her article entitled "graft and corruption in Cottbus?".

The circulation of Lausitzer Rundschau was 100,000 copies in January 1954. In the second quarter of 2003 the paper sold 136,259 copies.

References

External links
  
 

1946 establishments in Germany
Daily newspapers published in Germany
Mass media in East Germany
German-language communist newspapers
Mass media in Cottbus
Publications established in 1946